Amnouy Wetwithan ( born 18 July 1979) is a Thai para-badminton player who competes in international elite competitions. Amnouy competed for Thailand at the 2020 Summer Paralympics and won a bronze medal in the women's doubles WH1–WH2 event.

Achievements

Paralympic Games 
Women's doubles

World Championships 
Women's singles

Women’s doubles

Mixed doubles

Asian Para Games 
Women's singles

Women’s doubles

Mixed doubles

Asian Championships 
Women's singles

Women's doubles

Mixed doubles

ASEAN Para Games 
Women's singles

Mixed doubles

BWF Para Badminton World Circuit (2 runners-up) 
The BWF Para Badminton World Circuit – Grade 2, Level 1, 2 and 3 tournaments has been sanctioned by the Badminton World Federation from 2022.

Women's singles

Mixed doubles

International Tournaments (17 titles, 9 runners-up) 
Women's singles

Women's doubles

Mixed doubles

References

Notes

External links
 

1979 births
Living people
Amnouy Wetwithan
Amnouy Wetwithan
Badminton players at the 2020 Summer Paralympics
Paralympic medalists in badminton
Amnouy Wetwithan
Medalists at the 2020 Summer Paralympics
Amnouy Wetwithan
Amnouy Wetwithan
Amnouy Wetwithan
Amnouy Wetwithan
Amnouy Wetwithan